The Panj ("River Five") (پنج; "Five"), traditionally known as the Ochus River and also known as Pyandzh (derived from its Russian name "Пяндж"), is a tributary of the Amu Darya. It forms a considerable part of the Afghanistan–Tajikistan border.

The river is formed by the confluence of the Pamir River and the Wakhan River near the village of Qalʿa-ye Panja (Qalʽeh-ye Panjeh).  From there, it flows westwards, forming the border of Afghanistan and Tajikistan. After passing the city of Khorugh, capital of the Gorno-Badakhshan Autonomous Region of Tajikistan it receives water from one of its main tributaries, the Bartang River. It then turns towards the southwest, before joining the river Vakhsh and forming the greatest river of Central Asia, the Amu Darya. Panj played an important role during Soviet times, and was a strategic river during the Soviet military operations in Afghanistan in the 1980s.

Water consumption

A water treaty between the Soviet Union and Afghanistan, signed in 1946, allows Afghanistan to draw 9 million cubic metres of water a year.   
It currently draws 2 million cubic metres of water.  According to the Panj River Basin Project environmental damage could be expected if Afghanistan drew the entire amount of water from the river that the treaty allows.

Bridges

 Afghanistan-Tajikistan Bridge: A highway bridge was built over the river between Tajikistan and Afghanistan at Nizhnii Panj. The contract was awarded in May 2005 and the construction  of the bridge began in Jan 2006 and was completed in August 2007. The financing was provided by the US, amounting to US$37 million, and the construction was done by an Italian General Construction company Rizzani de Eccher S.p.A. under the ownership of US Army Corps of Engineers. The bridge replaces a barge that could transport only 60 cars a day and which was unusable many months in the year due to strong currents in the river. RAWA reports that this facilitates the heroin trade, the key to the economic miracle in Afghanistan.
 Another bridge was built at the confluence with the Gunt River at Khorog in 2003.
 A bridge exists at Langar, which may still be closed.

The Aga Khan Development Network has been engaged in a project to build a series of three bridges across the Panj River between Tajikistan and Afghanistan.
 The first of these bridges, connecting Tem on the Tajik side with Demogan on the Afghan side, was inaugurated by Tajikistan's President Emomali Rahmonov, Afghanistan's Vice-President Hedayat Amin Arsala and His Highness the Aga Khan in November, 2002.
 This was followed by the inauguration of the Tajik-Afghan Friendship Bridge at Darwaz in July, 2004,
 The Ishkashim bridge between Ishkashim, Afghanistan and Ishkashim, Tajikistan was inaugurated in October, 2006.

See also
 Extreme points of Afghanistan

References

Rivers of Afghanistan
Rivers of Tajikistan
Border rivers
International rivers of Asia
Afghanistan–Tajikistan border
Gorno-Badakhshan Autonomous Region
Ramsar sites in Tajikistan
Landforms of Badakhshan Province